Eaton is a city in, and the county seat of Preble County, Ohio, United States, approximately 24 mi (38 km) west of Dayton. The population was 8,375 at the 2020 census, down 0.4% from the population of 8,407 at the 2010 census.Eaton city, Preble County, Ohio Demographics and Housing 2020 Decennial Census | cincinnati.com Eaton's sister city is Rödental bei Coburg (Germany).

History
Eaton was founded and platted in 1806 by William Bruce.  The village derives its name from Gen. William Eaton (1764–1811), the U.S. Consul at Tunis, who led a diverse army in a harrowing march from Egypt to Tripoli to meet the U.S. Naval forces. In addition to the city of Eaton and the county of Preble, various streets in Eaton (Barron, Decatur, Israel, Wadsworth, and Somers) were named in honor of heroes of the First Barbary War and the Second Barbary War.

The town grew quickly following its establishment. In 1846, the town first had 1000 inhabitants. This growth was primarily derived from the town's location at the strategic junction of two turnpikes.  In 1849, Eaton was the site of a cholera outbreak. About half of the inhabitants fled; of the remaining 600 people, 120 died.

19th century fire
In June 1859 a fire in Eaton destroyed thirteen of its primary business establishments. The total loss was estimated at $40,000 to $50,000. Caused by incendiaries, the fire scorched the courthouse and left it a brown color. The disaster was first reported by the Cincinnati Commercial.

Geography

The city includes Crystal Lake and Seven Mile Creek. Parks include: Fort St. Clair, Water Works Park, 7-Mile Park, and Clarence Hook Memorial Park.

Demographics

2020 census
As of the 2020 United States Census, there were 8,375 people living in Eaton. The racial makeup of the city was 92.8% white, 0.9% black or African American, 0.2% American Indian, 0.9% Asian, 0.0% Pacific Islander, 0.6% from other races, and 4.5% from two or more races. Those of Hispanic or Latino ethnicity made up 1.2% of the population.Eaton city, Preble County, Ohio Demographics and Housing 2020 Decennial Census | cincinnati.com

2010 census
As of the census of 2010, there were 8,407 people, 3,486 households, and 2,181 families living in the city. The racial makeup of the city was 96.3% White, 0.6% African American, 0.2% Native American, 1.0% Asian, 0.5% from other races, and 1.5% from two or more races. Hispanic or Latino of any race were 0.8% of the population.

There were 3,486 households, of which 30.3% had children under the age of 18 living with them, 44.2% were married couples living together, 13.7% had a female householder with no husband present, 4.6% had a male householder with no wife present, and 37.4% were non-families. 32.7% of all households were made up of individuals, and 15.5% had someone living alone who was 65 years of age or older. The average household size was 2.33 and the average family size was 2.90.

The median age in the city was 40.4 years. 23.3% of residents were under the age of 18; 8% were between the ages of 18 and 24; 23.7% were from 25 to 44; 25.7% were from 45 to 64; and 19.1% were 65 years of age or older. The gender makeup of the city was 47.2% male and 52.8% female.

2000 census
As of the census of 2000, there were 8,133 people, 3,274 households, and 2,183 families living in the city.  The population density was 1,434.2 people per square mile (553.8/km2).  There were 3,467 housing units at an average density of 611.4 per square mile (236.1/km2).  The racial makeup of the city was 98.02% White, 0.39% African American, 0.09% Native American, 0.55% Asian, 0.02% Pacific Islander, 0.07% from other races, and 0.85% from two or more races. Hispanic or Latino of any race were 0.57% of the population.

There were 3,274 households, out of which 30.3% had children under the age of 18 living with them, 51.3% were married couples living together, 11.2% had a female householder with no husband present, and 33.3% were non-families. 29.1% of all households were made up of individuals, and 14.0% had someone living alone who was 65 years of age or older.  The average household size was 2.37 and the average family size was 2.89.

In the city, the population was spread out, with 24.0% under the age of 18, 8.7% from 18 to 24, 27.5% from 25 to 44, 21.6% from 45 to 64, and 18.1% who were 65 years of age or older.  The median age was 38 years. For every 100 females, there were 89.6 males.  For every 100 females age 18 and over, there were 85.6 males.

The median income for a household in the city was $37,231, and the median income for a family was $42,241. Males had a median income of $32,404 versus $24,006 for females. The per capita income for the city was $16,771.  About 5.8% of families and 8.7% of the population were below the poverty line, including 10.0% of those under age 18 and 9.5% of those age 65 or over.

Arts and culture

Eaton hosts the annual Preble County Pork Festival, held the third full weekend each September, and the summer Preble County Fair.

Downtown Eaton is home to Preble Arts, the art center of Preble County Art Association.

Eaton has a branch and administrative offices of the Preble County District Library.

Education
Eaton Community Schools operates two elementary schools, one middle school, and Eaton High School.

Edison State Community College operates a satellite campus in Eaton.

Notable people
 Victor J. Banis - "the godfather of modern popular gay fiction."
 Andrew L. Harris - Civil War general and former governor of Ohio.
Jane LeCompte - novelist who has written over 20 romance novels under the name Jane Ashford
 Travis Miller - former Major League Baseball pitcher for the Minnesota Twins.
 William Stephens - former mayor of Los Angeles and 24th governor of California (1917-1923).
 Kent Vosler - diver in the 1976 Olympics in Montreal.

References

External links
 City website

 
1806 establishments in Ohio
County seats in Ohio
Cities in Preble County, Ohio
Populated places established in 1806
Cities in Ohio